The Osaka Mayor's Cup is an ITF Grade A junior tennis tournament. It is held annually in Osaka.

Champions

Boys Singles

Boys Doubles

Girls Singles

Girls Doubles

References

External links 
ITF: Osaka Mayor's Cup

Junior tennis
Sport in Osaka
Tennis tournaments in Japan
Recurring sporting events established in 2002
Hard court tennis tournaments